Lucas da Cruz Kanieski (born 25 January 1990 in Dourados) is a Brazilian competitive swimmer.

At the 2010 South American Games, Kanieski won the gold medal in the 800-metre freestyle, and two silver medals in the 400-metre and 1500-metre freestyle.

He was at the 2010 Pan Pacific Swimming Championships in Irvine, where he finished 12th in the 800-metre freestyle, 18th in the 1500-metre freestyle  and 27th in the 400-metre freestyle.

Kanieski competed at the 2010 FINA World Swimming Championships (25 m), in Dubai, where he finished 23rd in the 400-metre freestyle, eighth in the 1500-metre freestyle  and also eighth in the 4×200-metre freestyle. In the 1500-metre freestyle, broke the short-course South American record, with a time of 14:45.51.

At the 2011 Pan American Games, Kanieski won the silver medal in the 4×200-metre freestyle, by participating at heats. Also ranked 5th in the 400-metre freestyle  and in the 1500-metre freestyle 

At the 2013 FINA Swimming World Cup in Moscow, Russia, Kanieski broke the short-course South American record in the 1500-metre freestyle, with a time of 14:44.66.

At the 2015 Pan American Games in Toronto, Ontario, Canada, Kanieski finished 7th in the 1500-metre freestyle, and 10th in the 400 metre freestyle.

On 13 September 2016, at the José Finkel Trophy (short-course competition), he broke the South American record in the 1500-metre freestyle, with a time of 14:40.31.

At the 2016 FINA World Swimming Championships (25 m) in Windsor, Ontario, Canada, he finished 20th in the Men's 400 metre freestyle and 27th in the Men's 1500 metre freestyle.

References

External links 
 

1990 births
Living people
People from Dourados
Brazilian male freestyle swimmers
Pan American Games silver medalists for Brazil
Pan American Games medalists in swimming
Swimmers at the 2011 Pan American Games
Swimmers at the 2015 Pan American Games
Medalists at the 2011 Pan American Games
South American Games gold medalists for Brazil
South American Games silver medalists for Brazil
South American Games medalists in swimming
Competitors at the 2010 South American Games
Sportspeople from Mato Grosso do Sul
20th-century Brazilian people
21st-century Brazilian people